Antonella Lualdi (born Antonietta de Pascale; 6 July 1931) is an Italian actress and singer. She appeared in many Italian and French films in the 1950s and 1960s, notably in Claude Autant-Lara's film The Red and the Black in 1954, opposite Gérard Philipe.

Life and career
She began her career in 1949, after having won a contest for new talents of the cinema magazine Hollywood, in which she was presented as "Signorina X" ("Miss X"), inviting the readers to choose her stage name.

After having starred with him in several films, she married Italian actor Franco Interlenghi in 1955; the couple had two daughters, Stella and Antonellina, an actress in her own right.

In 1974 she debuted in France as a singer with some success and critical appreciation, then she also debuted on stage with the comedy Le Moulin de la Galette, with which she toured across several European countries.

Selected filmography

 Prince of Foxes (1949) - (uncredited)
 Little Lady (1949) - Maria Censi
 Songs in the Streets (1950) - Anna
 The Last Sentence (1951) - Maria, la nipote di Santini
 Abbiamo vinto! (1951) - Elsa Nardecchi
 Miracle in Viggiù (1951) - Antonella
 His Last Twelve Hours (1951) - Daniela Valsetti
 The Two Sergeants (1951)
 Ha fatto tredici (1951) - Mirella
 Repentance (1952)
 The Overcoat (1952) - Vittoria
 Adorable Creatures (1952) - Catherine Michaud
 I figli non si vendono (1952) - Daniela
 Three Forbidden Stories (1952) - Anna Maria (Second segment)
 Il romanzo della mia vita (1952) - Maria De Marchis
 The Piano Tuner Has Arrived (1952) - Giulietta Narducci
 Cats and Dogs (1952) - Lia
 Solo per te Lucia (1952)
 The Blind Woman of Sorrento (1953) - Beatrice di Rionero
 Perdonami! (1953) - Anna Gerace
 The Daughter of the Regiment (1953) - Tony (Italian version)
 Cavalcade of Song (1953) - La dirimpettaia del quinto piano
 The Story of William Tell (1953) - Anna Walden
 What Scoundrels Men Are! (1953) - Mariuccia
 Casta Diva (1954) - Maddalena Fumaroli
 Mid-Century Loves (1954) - Carla (segment "Napoli 1943")
 Chronicle of Poor Lovers (1954) - Milena
 Pietà per chi cade (1954) - Bianca Savelli
 Papà Pacifico (1954) - Luisa Ceccacci
 Avanzi di galera (1954) - Giovanna, the nurse
 The Red and the Black (1954) - Mathilde de La Mole
 Le signorine dello 04 (1955) - Maria Teresa
 Wild Love (1955) - Luisa
 Andrea Chénier (1955) - Madeleine de Coigny
 Wild Love (1956) - Adriana Latini - la parrucchiera
 Altair (1956) - Elena
 I giorni più belli (1956) - Giulia
 Fathers and Sons (1957) - Giulia Blasi
 Méfiez-vous fillettes (1957) - Dany Dumont
 La cenicienta y Ernesto (1957) - Julia
 Young Husbands (1958) - Lucia
 The Sky Burns (1958) - Laura Sandri
 Mon coquin de père (1958) - Maria
 One Life (1958) - Gilberte de Fourcheville
 Polikuschka (1958) - Irina
 Délit de fuite (1959) - Lucille Aitken
 Bad Girls Don't Cry (1959) - Supplizia
 Match contre la mort (1959) - Annie Lourmel
 Web of Passion (1959) - Léda
 Silver Spoon Set (1960) - Elsa Foresi
 Run with the Devil (1960) - Donata
 Appuntamento a Ischia (1960) - Mirella Argenti
 The Mongols (1961) - Amina
 The Shortest Day (1962)
 My Son, the Hero (1962)
 Disorder (1962)
Son of the Circus (1963)
 The Swindlers (1963)
 100 Horsemen (1964)
 Let's Talk About Women (1964)
 Su e giù (1965)
 The Sea Pirate (1966)
 How to Seduce a Playboy (1966)
 Massacre in the Black Forest (1967)
 The Column (1968)
 Ragan (1968)
 Un caso di coscienza (1970)
 Vincent, François, Paul and the Others (1974)
 Cross Shot (1976)
 Zero in condotta (1983)
 A Thorn in the Heart (1986)
 Who Wants to Kill Sara? (1992)
 Nefertiti (1994)

Awards
 Premio Cinema italiano Anni d'oro. In 2020 Antonella Lualdi received the award for her role in the 1959 movie "La notte Brava" (Bad Girls Don't Cry), directed by Mauro Bolognini.

References

External links

1931 births
Living people
Italian film actresses
Italian people of Greek descent
Lebanese emigrants to Italy
Actresses from Beirut
Italian stage actresses
20th-century Italian actresses
20th-century Italian women singers
Musicians from Beirut